Kristoffer Douglas Lang (born December 12, 1979) is an American professional basketball player. He played college basketball for North Carolina between 1998 and 2002 before playing professionally in Poland, NBA D-League, South Korea, Spain, Italy, Ukraine, Turkey, Venezuela, Dominican Republic, Argentina, and Uruguay.

College career
Lang played college basketball for North Carolina between 1998 and 2002. In 128 career games, he averaged 10.9 points and 5.3 rebounds per game.

Professional career
Lang made his professional debut in Poland, spending the 2002–03 season with Anwil Włocławek and winning the PLK championship. For the 2003–04 season, he returned to the U.S. and helped the Asheville Altitude win the NBDL championship. For the 2004–05 season, he moved to South Korea to play for the Seoul SK Knights. He finished the season in Spain with Unicaja Málaga. The next two seasons were spent in Italy with Virtus Bologna.

After spending preseason with the San Antonio Spurs in the NBA in October 2007, Lang moved to Ukraine for a short stint with Azovmash Mariupol. He returned to the U.S. in December 2007 to join the Austin Toros. He left the Toros in February 2008 and moved to Turkey to play for Türk Telekom. He continued on with Türk Telekom for the 2008–09 and 2009–10 seasons. Lang returned to Italy for the 2010–11 season to play for Enel Brindisi. He remained in Italy for the 2011–12 season, re-joining Virtus Bologna.

In 2013, Lang began what would be a six-year stint in South America. He played six seasons in the Venezuelan LPB (Cocodrilos de Caracas 2013–16; Bucaneros de La Guaira 2017; Panteras de Miranda 2018), a season in the Dominican Republic (Metros de Santiago 2015), half a season in Argentina (Regatas Corrientes 2016), and half a season in Uruguay (Defensor Sporting 2016).

References

External links
North Carolina Tar Heels bio
TBLStat.net Profile
Kris Lang EuroCup Player Profile
NBDL stats

1979 births
Living people
American expatriate basketball people in Argentina
American expatriate basketball people in Italy
American expatriate basketball people in Poland
American expatriate basketball people in South Korea
American expatriate basketball people in Spain
American expatriate basketball people in the Dominican Republic
American expatriate basketball people in Turkey
American expatriate basketball people in Ukraine
American expatriate basketball people in Uruguay
American expatriate basketball people in Venezuela
American men's basketball players
Asheville Altitude players
Austin Toros players
Basketball players from North Carolina
BC Azovmash players
Baloncesto Málaga players
Cocodrilos de Caracas players
KK Włocławek players
Liga ACB players
McDonald's High School All-Americans
New Basket Brindisi players
North Carolina Tar Heels men's basketball players
Parade High School All-Americans (boys' basketball)
People from Gastonia, North Carolina
Power forwards (basketball)
Seoul SK Knights players
Türk Telekom B.K. players
Virtus Bologna players
United States men's national basketball team players